David Vernon "D. J." Jones II,  (born May 8, 1988) is a former American football offensive tackle. He is currently a free agent. He was signed by the Miami Dolphins as an undrafted free agent in 2011 after a college football career with the Nebraska Cornhuskers. He spent portions of the 2011 season on the Dolphins' and Baltimore Ravens' practice squads. He was on the Ravens' active roster before he was waived in the postseason. The Eagles claimed him off waivers on February 6, 2012. He was waived by the Eagles on August 31, 2012, and claimed by the Giants on September 1, 2012. The Giants negated the claim on September 2, 2012, after Jones failed his physical.

References

External links
Philadelphia Eagles bio
Baltimore Ravens bio
Miami Dolphins bio
Nebraska Cornhuskers bio
www.ocaac.com

1988 births
Living people
Players of American football from Kansas City, Missouri
American football offensive tackles
Nebraska Cornhuskers football players
Miami Dolphins players
Baltimore Ravens players
Philadelphia Eagles players
New York Giants players